Timothy "Tiny Tim" Cratchit is a fictional character from the 1843 novella A Christmas Carol by Charles Dickens. Although seen only briefly, he is a major character, and serves as an important symbol of the consequences of the protagonist's choices.

Character overview
Tiny Tim is the young, ailing son of Bob Cratchit, Ebenezer Scrooge’s underpaid clerk. When Scrooge is visited by the Ghost of Christmas Present he is shown just how ill the boy really is (the family cannot afford to properly treat him on the salary Scrooge pays Cratchit). When visited by the Ghost of Christmas Yet to Come, Scrooge sees that Tiny Tim has died. This, and several other visions, led Scrooge to reform his ways. At the end of the story, Dickens makes it explicit that Tiny Tim does not die, and Scrooge becomes a "second father" to him.

In the story, Tiny Tim is known for the statement, "God bless us, every one!" which he offers as a blessing at Christmas dinner. Dickens repeats the phrase at the end of the story, symbolic of Scrooge's change of heart.

Character development
In earlier drafts, the character's name was "Little Fred." Dickens may have derived the name from his brothers, who both had "Fred" as a part of their names, one named Alfred and the other Frederick. Dickens also had a sister, Fanny, who had a disabled son named Henry Augustus Burnett (1839–1849) who may have been an inspiration for Tiny Tim. It has also been claimed that the character is based on the son of a friend, who owned a cotton mill in Ardwick, Manchester.

Dickens tried other names such as "Tiny Mick" after "Little Fred" but eventually decided upon "Tiny Tim". After dropping the name "Little Fred," Dickens later used it for Scrooge's nephew, "Fred".

Illness
Dickens did not explicitly say what Tiny Tim's illness was. In 1992, renal tubular acidosis (type 1), which is a type of kidney failure causing the blood to become acidic, has been proposed as one possibility. Rickets (caused by a lack of vitamin D) has been proposed as another possibility, as it was a not uncommon disease during that time period. Either illness was treatable during Dickens' lifetime, but fatal if not treated, thus following in line with the comment of the Ghost of Christmas Present that Tiny Tim would die "[i]f these shadows remain unaltered by the Future".

In 1997, an editorial was published in the Journal of Infectious Diseases, detailing a fictional account wherein construction workers renovating an 18th century church in south London uncovered Tiny Tim's burial site. In the account, the gravestone supposedly read: “Timothy Cratchit. 1839–1884. Beloved Husband of Julia, Father of Robert, and Son of Robert.” The skeleton was of a man who was about 40 years old who wore a frame of metal and leather on his legs and lower back. Histology was consistent with tuberculosis and polymerase chain reaction confirmed it. The article was likely written as a speculative piece in support of a differential diagnosis of Tim's ailment as Tuberculosis Spondylitis, or TB of the spine.

References

External links

 
 A Christmas Carol – In Prose – A Ghost Story of Christmas—Special Collections, University of Glasgow

A Christmas Carol characters
Child characters in film
Child characters in literature
Child characters in musical theatre
Literary characters introduced in 1843
Fictional people from London
Fictional characters with disabilities
Male characters in film
Male characters in literature